The Stinson L-13 (sometimes known as the Grasshopper, like other aircraft of its type) was a US military utility aircraft first flown in 1945.

Development
The aircraft design was developed at Stinson in response to a request from the United States Army Air Force for a light observation/liaison unit. At that time Stinson was a subsidiary of Consolidated Vultee. The first two prototypes were constructed at the Stinson facility in Michigan. In 1948 the Convair board were restructuring their various units, and negotiated to sell the Stinson subsidiary to Piper Aircraft. The L-13 project was specifically not included in the assets of the sale, however, and Convair continued its production in-house; ultimately building 300 units as the Convair L-13.

It was a conventional high-wing tailwheel monoplane used for observation, liaison, and air ambulance duties, which typically require low landing speeds and short landing rolls. It was fitted with oversize viewing areas to increase its reconnaissance role.

Following their military service and resale into the private market, some units were converted for civil bush flying use, fitting a radial engine  by Acme Aircraft Company as the Centaur, while others underwent similar conversions by Caribbean Traders Inc, as the Husky.

Variants
XL-13
Prototype aircraft, powered by 245 hp (183 kW) Franklin O-425-6 engine. Two built.
L-13A
Production aircraft, powered by 250 hp (187 kW) O-425-9 engine. 300 built.
L-13B
Conversion of L-13A for cold weather operation, capable of operating from wheels, skis or floats. 28 converted.
Acme Centaur 101
Conversion of L-13 as six-seat bush aircraft. Powered by 300 hp (224 kW) Lycoming R-680-E3. 
Acme Centaur 102
Similar to Acme Centaur 101, with a 300hp Jacobs R-755-A2 radial.

Caribbean Traders Husky I
Civil conversion of L-13A. Retained O-425 engine.
Caribbean Traders Husky II
Civil conversion of L-13A. Powered by 300 hp R-680-13 engine on modified engine mount capable of swinging out for easy maintenance. 
Caribbean Traders Husky III
Similar to Husky II, but powered by 450 hp (338 kW) Wright R-975-7 radial engine.
Servicair Loadmaster
Reconstruction of L-13A with 450 hp Pratt & Whitney R-985-AN-1 radial engine and rearranged four-seat cabin.

Operators

 United States Air Force
 United States Army received 43 ex-Air Force L-13As following the outbreak of the Korean War, serving in the Continental United States to free up aircraft for active service overseas.

Surviving aircraft

Brazil 
 47-406 – L-13 on display at the TAM Museum in São Carlos, São Paulo.

United States 
 47-275 – L-13A on display at the Arkansas Air and Military Museum in Fayetteville, Arkansas.
 47-287 – L-13A in storage at the Castle Air Museum in Atwater, California.
 47-316 – L-13A airworthy at the War Eagles Air Museum in Santa Teresa, New Mexico.
 47-355 – L-13 on static display at the Pearl Harbor Aviation Museum in Honolulu, Hawaii.
 47-394 – L-13A on static display at the Planes of Fame Air Museum in Chino, California.
 47-412 – L-13B airworthy at the Heritage Flight Museum in Burlington, Washington.

Specifications (L-13A)

See also

References

Notes

Bibliography 

 "Convair Conversion." Flight, 9 September 1955, p. 466.
  "Plane With Folding Wings Can Be Towed Like A Glider" , March 1947, Popular Mechanics rare photos of L-13 folded for towing by jeep 
 
 Harding, Stephen. U.S. Army Aircraft Since 1947. Shrewsbury, UK:Airlife, 1990. .
 Swanborough, F.G. and Bowers, Peter M. United States Military Aircraft since 1909. London:Putnam, 1963.
 Taylor, John W. R. Jane's All the World's Aircraft 1961–62. London: Sampson Low, Marston & Company, Ltd., 1961.
 Wegg, John. General Dynamics Aircraft and their Predecessors. London:Putnam, 1990. .

High-wing aircraft
L-13, Stinson
L-13
Single-engined tractor aircraft
Aircraft first flown in 1945